In oceanic biogeochemistry, the continental shelf pump is proposed to operate in the shallow waters of the continental shelves, acting as a mechanism to transport carbon (as either dissolved or particulate material) from surface waters to the interior of the adjacent deep ocean.

Overview
Originally formulated by Tsunogai et al. (1999), the pump is believed to occur where the solubility and biological pumps interact with a local hydrography that feeds dense water from the shelf floor into sub-surface (at least subthermocline) waters in the neighbouring deep ocean.  Tsunogai et al.'''s (1999) original work focused on the East China Sea, and the observation that, averaged over the year, its surface waters represented a sink for carbon dioxide.  This observation was combined with others of the distribution of dissolved carbonate and alkalinity and explained as follows :

 the shallowness of the continental shelf restricts convection of cooling water
 as a consequence, cooling is greater for continental shelf waters than for neighbouring open ocean waters
 this leads to the production of relatively cool and dense water on the shelf
 the cooler waters promote the solubility pump and lead to an increased storage of dissolved inorganic carbon
 this extra carbon storage is augmented by the increased biological production characteristic of shelves
 the dense, carbon-rich shelf waters sink to the shelf floor and enter the sub-surface layer of the open ocean via isopycnal mixing

Significance
Based on their measurements of the CO2 flux over the East China Sea (35 g C m−2 y−1), Tsunogai et al. (1999) estimated that the continental shelf pump could be responsible for an air-to-sea flux of approximately 1 Gt C y−1 over the world's shelf areas.  Given that observational and modelling of anthropogenic emissions of CO2 estimates suggest that the ocean is currently responsible for the uptake of approximately 2 Gt C y−1, and that these estimates are poor for the shelf regions, the continental shelf pump may play an important role in the ocean's carbon cycle.

One caveat to this calculation is that the original work was concerned with the hydrography of the East China Sea, where cooling plays the dominant role in the formation of dense shelf water, and that this mechanism may not apply in other regions.  However, it has been suggested that other processes may drive the pump under different climatic conditions.  For instance, in polar regions, the formation of sea-ice results in the extrusion of salt that may increase seawater density.  Similarly, in tropical regions, evaporation may increase local salinity and seawater density.

The strong sink of CO2 at temperate latitudes reported by Tsunogai et al.'' (1999) was later confirmed in the Gulf of Biscay, the Middle Atlantic Bight and the North Sea.  On the other hand, in the sub-tropical South Atlantic Bight reported a source of CO2 to the atmosphere.

Recently, work has compiled and scaled available data on CO2 fluxes in coastal environments, and shown that globally marginal seas act as a significant CO2 sink (-1.6 mol C m−2 y−1; -0.45 Gt C y−1) in agreement with previous estimates. However, the global sink of CO2 in marginal seas could be almost fully compensated by the emission of CO2 (+11.1 mol C m−2 y−1; +0.40 Gt C y−1) from the ensemble of near-shore coastal ecosystems, mostly related to the emission of CO2 from estuaries (0.34 Gt C y−1).

An interesting application of this work has been examining the impact of sea level rise over the last de-glacial transition on the global carbon cycle. During the last glacial maximum sea level was some  lower than today. As sea level rose the surface area of the shelf seas grew and in consequence the strength of the shelf sea pump should increase.

References

See also
 Biological pump
 Ocean acidification
 Solubility pump

Aquatic ecology
Biological oceanography
Carbon
Chemical oceanography
Geochemistry
Biogeochemistry
Continental shelves
Oceanographical terminology